Cytoplasmic dynein 1 intermediate chain 2 is a protein that in humans is encoded by the DYNC1I2 gene.

References

Further reading